The Guardian Student Media Awards''' were an annual UK-wide student journalism competition run by The Guardian newspaper. They were cancelled from 2016 onwards to save costs.

History
Since 1947, The National Union of Students (NUS) have run a student journalism competition of some kind. In 1978, The Guardian joined forces with the NUS for the inaugural NUS/Guardian Student Media Awards.

In the early years the competition was modest. Only a handful of categories - for Best Paper, Best Magazine, Best Photographer and Best Journalist existed - along with awards for student radio.

During the 1990s, the individual print categories began to rise exponentially, and today include Reporter, Feature writer, Critic, Sports writer, Diversity writer, Travel writer and Columnist. Meanwhile, the broadcast categories were dropped after the judges consistently reported insufficient quality to yield a shortlist. Other categories added included Publication Design and Website.
Small Budget Publication was also added, but it has now been replaced by Student Broadcaster.

Since 1999, The Guardian and the NUS have run separate student journalism awards. The Guardians are now simply called the Guardian Student Media Awards. The NUS meanwhile, launched the National Student Journalism Awards, which have been sponsored by The Independent (1999-2002), The Daily Mirror'' (2003-2005), The Press Association (2006- 2015) and Citizen Training (2016-)

Format
The Awards are launched in July each year, with a closing date at the beginning of September. Typically students are required to send their best three articles from the past academic year to be critiqued by a panel of senior national journalists. In early November, a shortlist of five entrants per category is printed in Media section of the newspaper. The winners and runners-up in each category, along with an overall student reporter of the year, are announced at a London ceremony at the beginning of December.

As of the 2014 awards, submissions were invited in the following categories:

A Student publication
B Student website
C Student reporter
D Student feature writer
E Student columnist
F Student critic
G Student photographer
H Student digital journalist
I Student broadcast journalist

Previous winners

Publication of the Year

Website of the Year

Reporter of the Year
Until 2009 there was a separate category of Student Journalist of the Year which was selected from all categories of the awards. This award was removed from 2010 onwards and awards are now only given in specific categories of entry.

Journalist of the Year (now defunct)

Feature writer of the Year

Columnist of the Year

Critic of the Year

Photographer of the Year

Publication Design of the Year (now defunct)

Diversity writer of the Year (now defunct)

Travel writer of the Year (now defunct)

Sports writer of the Year (now defunct)

Student Campaign (now defunct)

Magazine of the Year (now defunct)

Small Budget Publication (now defunct)

References

External links
 Guardian Student Media Awards 2009
Guardian Student Media Awards 2008

Student newspapers published in the United Kingdom
Student media awards
British journalism awards
The Guardian awards
1978 establishments in the United Kingdom
Awards established in 1978